Joey Tafolla is an American guitarist.

Biography
Born in San Diego, California, Tafolla is the son of Rosie Hamlin and Noah Tafolla, the singer and guitarist of Rosie and the Originals, who recorded the hit single "Angel baby" respectively. A member of the heavy metal band Jag Panzer from 1981 to 1985, Tafolla has rejoined the band several times over the years for CD's and live concerts. He joined Mike Varney's Shrapnel Records label soon after, releasing his debut album Out of the Sun in 1987, which included Tony MacAlpine, Paul Gilbert of Mr. Big, and Wally Voss, bassist for Yngwie Malmsteen. This album was released alongside the releases of other shred players such as Marty Friedman, Jason Becker, Paul Gilbert, Richie Kotzen, Tony MacAlpine and Vinnie Moore. His second release in 1991, Infra-Blue, was a noticeable departure from the neoclassical metal stylings of his first album, and demonstrated an intense blues fusion feel instrumental rock-oriented sound. Tafolla returned to Jag Panzer in 1995, but left again after 1997's "The Fourth Judgement" and again later for The Deviant Chord CD. Tafolla has also toured or recorded with Quiet Riot, Michael Sweet, Wolf Pakk.

Discography

Solo albums
1987: Out of the Sun
1991: Infra-Blue
2001: Plastic

With Jag Panzer
1984: Ample Destruction
1997: The Fourth Judgement
2017: The Deviant Chord

With Graham Bonnet Band
2018: Meanwhile Back In The Garage
With Tyrese

 2000: 2000 Watts

Others
1989: Guitar Masters, Roadrunner Records
1990: An Axe To Grind, Ken Tamplin, Frontline
1992: Guitar on the edge, Vol 1, No.1, Legato Records
1995: In the Witness Box, Ken Tamplin, Brunette
1998: Metal Guitars - High Voltage Instrumentals, Disky Communications
2006: Guitar Odyssey, Milan Polak, Lion Music
2009: Shrapnel's Super Shredders: Neoclassical, Shrapnel
2009: This is Shredding, Vol. 1, Shrapnel

Instructional
1993: Shredding'', REH830, CPP Media Group

References

External links
JTM Merchandising

Living people
American rock guitarists
American male guitarists
Lead guitarists
20th-century American guitarists
20th-century American male musicians
Shrapnel Records artists
Year of birth missing (living people)